NCAA Season 76 is the 2000–01 season of the National Collegiate Athletic Association (Philippines), which was hosted by Mapua Institute of Technology.

Basketball

Elimination round

Men's playoffs

Volleyball

Football

See also
 UAAP Season 63

2000 in multi-sport events
76
2001 in multi-sport events
2000 in Philippine sport
2001 in Philippine sport